Doris Heneti "Tina" Morgan ( – 1987) was a New Zealand Paralympian who competed in athletics and swimming. At the 1972 Summer Paralympics, she won a bronze medal in the 25m Freestyle 1B.

References

External links 
 
 

1930s births
1987 deaths
Place of birth missing
Date of birth missing
Place of death missing
Date of death missing
Paralympic athletes of New Zealand
Athletes (track and field) at the 1972 Summer Paralympics
Swimmers at the 1972 Summer Paralympics
Medalists at the 1972 Summer Paralympics
Paralympic bronze medalists for New Zealand
New Zealand female freestyle swimmers
20th-century New Zealand women
New Zealand female discus throwers
New Zealand female javelin throwers
New Zealand female shot putters
Wheelchair discus throwers
Wheelchair javelin throwers
Wheelchair shot putters
Paralympic discus throwers
Paralympic javelin throwers
Paralympic shot putters